The Pine Bluff and Jefferson County Library System (PBJCLS) is a public library system in Jefferson County, Arkansas, with the main library at Pine Bluff. It is housed in five buildings in Jefferson County. The library's functions are overseen by the Pine Bluff and Jefferson County Library System Board of Trustees.

History
In 1979, an interlocal agreement was established between the City of Pine Bluff and Jefferson County, creating the Pine Bluff and Jefferson County Library System. A proposal to make a $16 million bond, funded by a 3 mill increase of property taxes for a 30 year period, was approved by voters in 2016. In 2020 a proposal to increase property taxes by .25-mill for the library branches was approved. It also established a system of curbside service for its branch libraries.

Main library

The Pine Bluff Public Library is located at 600 South Main Street and includes the Ann Lightsey Children's Library; it also maintains the Bill Carr Memorial Room. The main library has an extensive collection of genealogy materials, and more than 20 computers for the public to use, many with Internet access.

The library was established in 1913 as a library association with the generous support of the Pine Bluff Chapter of the Daughters of the American Revolution. In 2016 a flood affected the old library building. Another flood occurred in 2017 due to a faulty pump. The new library opened in 2020 at a cost of $10,500,000. The library building has ~ of space.

Branches

Altheimer
The Altheimer Public Library is located at 222 South Edline in Altheimer. Established in 2001, it was built on a  tract of land sold by the Altheimer Unified School District to Jefferson County for $3,784. Identical to the Redfield Public Library, the library building has ~ of space.

Redfield
The Redfield Public Library, formally the Leenita Gober Cothran Memorial Library, is located at 310 South Brodie Street in Redfield. Established in 1999, it is named for Leenita Sue Gober Cothran, a local resident killed in a vehicle accident. The Redfield library building has ~ of space.

Watson Chapel
The Watson Chapel Public Library, formally the Dave Burdick Library, is located at 4120 Camden Road in the Watson Chapel neighborhood of Pine Bluff. It is named for David Burdick, a former library director.

White Hall
The White Hall Public Library, formally the Dr. Cora Economos Library, is located at 300 Anderson Avenue in White Hall. Established in 1979, it is named for Cora Matheny Economos, a former library director.

References

External links

 

1979 establishments in Arkansas
Buildings and structures in Jefferson County, Arkansas
County library systems in Arkansas
Education in Jefferson County, Arkansas
Genealogical libraries in the United States
Libraries established in 1979
Library districts